The Waucoma Hotel is a historic hotel building in Hood River, Oregon, United States.

The hotel was listed on the National Register of Historic Places in 1981.

The Waucoma Hotel was remodeled and reopened in 1910 as the Hotel Oregon. The hotel closed in 1973.

See also

National Register of Historic Places listings in Hood River County, Oregon

References

External links

1904 establishments in Oregon
Buildings and structures in Hood River, Oregon
Hotel buildings completed in 1904
Hotels established in 1904
National Register of Historic Places in Hood River County, Oregon